Bunker Creek may refer to:

Bunker Creek (Montana)
Bunker Creek (New Hampshire)